Callaway County is a county located in the U.S. state of Missouri. As of the 2020 United States Census, the county's population was 44,283. Its county seat is Fulton. With a border formed by the Missouri River, the county was organized November 25, 1820, and named for Captain James Callaway, grandson of Daniel Boone. The county has been historically referred to as "The Kingdom of Callaway" after an incident in which some residents confronted Union troops during the U.S. Civil War.

Callaway County is part of the Jefferson City, Missouri, Metropolitan Statistical Area.

Vineyards and wineries were first established in the area by German immigrants in the mid-19th century. Among the first mentioned in county histories are those around the southeastern Callaway settlement of Heilburn, a community neighboring Portland, on the Missouri River. Since the 1960s, there has been a revival of winemaking there and throughout Missouri.

The Callaway Nuclear Generating Station is located in Callaway County, near Fulton.

History
This area was historically occupied by the Osage and other Native American peoples, some of whom migrated from east of the Ohio River Valley. Others emerged as cultures in this area, following thousands of years of settlement by indigenous peoples.

The early European-American settlement of Callaway County was largely by migrants from the Upper South states of Virginia, Kentucky, and Tennessee, with an influx of German immigrants starting in the 1830s, as was the case with other counties along the Missouri River. Some of them brought black slaves and enslavement practices with them, and quickly started cultivating hemp and tobacco, the same crops as were grown in Middle Tennessee and Kentucky. Given their culture and traditions, this area became known as Little Dixie. By 1860, enslaved people made up at least 25 percent of the county's population, higher than in most parts of the state.

On October 27, 1860, a woman known as "Slave Teney" was lynched by whites near Fulton after she confessed to killing the daughter of her owner. 
 
Some pioneer families from Callaway and Lewis County, Missouri, moved to the West and became influential early settlers of the nascent state of California. Callaway families helped settle areas of California near the Oregon border, as they entered the state via the Oregon Trail, then southward toward San Francisco. Lewis County relatives helped build Sacramento and develop viticulture in the California Central Valley and areas north of San Francisco Bay. Some of these Missouri families, later key U.S./Unionist advocates and military personnel during the U.S. Civil War, held early local and statewide political offices in California.

The minutes of the U.S. Congressional hearing on the legitimacy of U.S. Civil-war-era elections in Callaway County include reports of substantial election meddling and voter harassment and intimidation, summarized in the 1867-68 Reports of Committees of the House of Representatives. It described the Confederate support in the county, citing prominent citizens, but the report also demonstrated that there was substantial county support for Union/U.S. government among citizens who were often intimidated into silence. Historians therefore cannot ascertain exact percentages of Union or Confederate sympathies in the county.

The Battle of Moore's Mill was the only significant Civil War battle that took place in Callaway County. One historian said it was known as "Kingdom of Callaway". A truce with U.S./Union forces during the war effectively allowed Confederate advocates to continue to operate under surveillance, in proximity to the Missouri government offices in Jefferson City. There may have been more than twice as many Confederate as U.S./Union troops in Callaway. A so-called "Confederate government of Missouri" set up offices in southwest Missouri near the Arkansas border, while a line almost straight south along the Arkansas-Oklahoma border connected it to a known Texas-affiliate (and possibly controlling) office set up across from the southwest corner of Arkansas in Marshall, Texas.

According to "A Short History of Callaway County" by Ovid Bell, the publisher of the (county seat) Fulton Daily Sun Gazette, "Fulton was occupied during the greater part of the war by Union soldiers and militia, and Southern (i.e. Confederate) sympathizers were in constant fear of imprisonment and death."  U.S. forces loyal to the Union were raised by Captains William T Snell, Henry Thomas, and JJP Johnson. They were reinforced by troops under General John B. Henderson from the town of Louisiana in Pike County, Missouri.

After the late-1860s Reconstruction era, an element of white residents in the state and county worked to restore white supremacy. Violence against Black people reached a peak around the turn of the 20th century, when whites lynched a total of four African Americans in the county. The victims included Ham Peterson in May 1884, killed because his brother spoke disrespectfully to whites; an unnamed African-American man killed by a mob in October 1884, after being accused of raping a young girl; and Emmett Divens, lynched August 15, 1895.

Other settlers in the Missouri River valley included German immigrants from the mid-19th century following the Revolutions of 1848 in the German states; they established a strong wine industry in the area and built towns with German-influenced architecture, concentrated substantially in counties south of Callaway and across the Missouri River, celebrated annually in the Maifest events in the Gasconade county seat, Hermann.  Missouri was the second-largest wine-producing state nationally until Prohibition. Since the 1960s, numerous vineyards and wineries have been established again in the river valley, including Summit Lake Winery in Holts Summit. One definition of the Missouri Rhineland can be found in a Chicago Tribune article of September 2018.

Callaway has remained largely agricultural, economically, with its rich farmlands, yet borders Missouri's capital city and Lincoln University (Missouri) in Cole County, to the south, and the main University of Missouri campus in Columbia, 40 miles or less from the most populous areas of the county.  Callaway County has for years hosted William Woods University and Westminster College in the county seat, Fulton, while Osage county, to the south, hosts the State Technical College of Missouri in Linn.

Geography

The northern part of the county is relatively flat and devoid of large tracts of forests. The southern border of the county is the Missouri River, and the area is heavily forested over large hills and valleys. Cedar Creek makes up the bulk of the county's western border. Jefferson City lies across the Missouri River from the southwestern corner of the county.

Adjacent counties
 Audrain County (north)
 Montgomery County (east)
 Osage County (south)
 Cole County (southwest)
 Boone County (west)
 Gasconade County  (southeast)

Major highways
  Interstate 70
  U.S. Route 40
  U.S. Route 54
  U.S. Route 63
  Route 94

National protected areas
Big Muddy National Fish and Wildlife Refuge (part)
Mark Twain National Forest (part)

Climate

Demographics

As of the census of 2000, there were 40,766 people, 14,416 households, and 10,336 families residing in the county. The population density was 49 people per square mile (19/km2).  There were 16,167 housing units at an average density of 19 per square mile (7/km2).  The racial makeup of the county was self-identified as 91.79% White, 5.66% Black or African American, 0.52% Native American, 0.52% Asian, 0.01% Pacific Islander, 0.30% from other races, and 1.21% from two or more races. Approximately 0.92% of the population identified as Hispanic or Latino of any race. 29.9% identified as of German ancestry, 22.0% as American, 9.1% as Irish (including Scots-Irish) and 9.1% as English ancestry.

There were 14,416 households, out of which 35.80% had children under the age of 18 living with them, 57.10% were married couples living together, 10.40% had a female householder with no husband present, and 28.30% were non-families. 23.00% of all households were made up of individuals, and 8.80% had someone living alone who was 65 years of age or older. The average household size was 2.56 and the average family size was 3.00.

In the county, the population was spread out, with 25.40% under the age of 18, 11.10% from 18 to 24, 31.00% from 25 to 44, 21.50% from 45 to 64, and 11.00% who were 65 years of age or older. The median age was 35 years. For every 100 females, there were 107.60 males. For every 100 females age 18 and over, there were 108.90 males.

The median income for a household in the county was $39,110, and the median income for a family was $44,474. Males had a median income of $29,574 versus $22,317 for females. The per capita income for the county was $17,005. About 6.00% of families and 8.50% of the population were below the poverty line, including 10.30% of those under age 18 and 8.30% of those age 65 or over.

Religion
According to the Association of Religion Data Archives County Membership Report (2010), Callaway County is sometimes regarded as being on the northern edge of the Bible Belt, with evangelical Protestantism being the most predominant religion. The most predominant denominations among residents in Callaway County who adhere to a religion are Southern Baptists (41.60%), Roman Catholics (14.00%), and United Methodists (9.41%).

2020 Census

Education

School districts include:
 Community R-VI School District
 Fulton 58 School District
 Jefferson City Public Schools
 Mexico 59 School District
 Montgomery County R-II School District
 New Bloomfield R-III School District
 North Callaway County R-I School District
 South Callaway County R-II School District
 Wellsville-Middletown R-I School District

Public schools
Fulton School District No. 58 – Fulton - See article for the school list
New Bloomfield R-III School District – New Bloomfield
New Bloomfield Elementary School (PK-06) 
New Bloomfield High School (07-12)
North Callaway County R-I School District – Kingdom City 
Auxvasse Elementary School (PK-08) – Auxvasse
Hatton-McCredie Elementary School (K-08) 
Williamsburg Elementary School (K-08) 
North Callaway County High School (09-12)
South Callaway County R-II School District – Mokane
South Callaway County Early Childhood Education Center (PK-02) 
South Callaway County Elementary School (03-05) 
South Callaway County Middle School (06-08) 
South Callaway County High School (09-12)

Missouri School for the Deaf, a state-operated school, is in Missouri, within the county.

Private schools
St. Peter Catholic School – Fulton (K-09) – Roman Catholic
Kingdom Christian Academy – Fulton (PK-09) – Nondenominational Christian
Shepherdsfield School – Fulton (K-12) – Nondenominational Christian

Post-secondary
Westminster College - Fulton - A private, four-year Presbyterian university.
William Woods University - Fulton - A private, four-year university.

Public libraries
Callaway County Public Library

Politics

Local
The Republican Party completely controls politics at the local level in Callaway County, holding every elected position in the county.

State

Callaway County is split between two legislative districts in the Missouri House of Representatives, both of which are held by Republicans.

District 43 — Kent Haden (R-Mexico). Consists of the communities of Auxvasse, Portland, Steedman, and Williamsburg.

District 49 — Travis Fitzwater (R-Holts Summit). Consists of the communities of Fulton, Holts Summit, Kingdom City, Lake Mykee Town, Mokane, New Bloomfield, and Tebbetts.

All of Callaway County is a part of Missouri's 10th District in the Missouri Senate and is currently represented by Jeanie Riddle (R-Mokane).

Federal
All of Callaway County is included in Missouri's 3rd Congressional District and is currently represented by Blaine Luetkemeyer (R-St. Elizabeth) in the U.S. House of Representatives. Luetkemeyer was elected to a seventh term in 2020 over Democratic challenger Megan Rezabek.

Callaway County, along with the rest of the state of Missouri, is represented in the U.S. Senate by Josh Hawley (R-Columbia) and Roy Blunt (R-Strafford).

Blunt was elected to a second term in 2016 over then-Missouri Secretary of State Jason Kander.

Political culture

At the presidential level, Callaway County has become solidly Republican in recent years despite being a Democratic stronghold for much of its history. Callaway County strongly favored Donald Trump in both 2016 and 2020. Bill Clinton was the last Democratic presidential nominee to carry Callaway County in 1996 with a plurality of the vote, and a Democrat hasn't won majority support from the county's voters in a presidential election since Lyndon Johnson in 1964.

Like most rural areas throughout Missouri, voters in Callaway County generally adhere to socially and culturally conservative principles which tend to influence their Republican leanings. Despite Callaway County's longstanding tradition of supporting socially conservative platforms, voters in the county have a penchant for advancing populist causes. In 2018, Missourians voted on a proposition (Proposition A) concerning right to work, the outcome of which ultimately reversed the right to work legislation passed in the state the previous year. 62.63% of Callaway County voters cast their ballots to overturn the law.

Missouri presidential preference primaries

2020
The 2020 presidential primaries for both the Democratic and Republican parties were held in Missouri on March 10. On the Democratic side, former Vice President Joe Biden (D-Delaware) both won statewide and carried Callaway County by a wide margin. Biden went on to defeat President Donald Trump in the general election.

Incumbent President Donald Trump (R-Florida) faced a primary challenge from former Massachusetts Governor Bill Weld, but won both Callaway County and statewide by overwhelming margins.

2016
The 2016 presidential primaries for both the Republican and Democratic parties were held in Missouri on March 15. Businessman Donald Trump (R-New York) narrowly won the state overall, but Senator Ted Cruz (R-Texas) carried a plurality in Callaway County. Trump went on to win the nomination and the presidency.

On the Democratic side, former Secretary of State Hillary Clinton (D-New York) narrowly won statewide, but Senator Bernie Sanders (I-Vermont) carried a majority of the vote in Callaway County.

2012
The 2012 Missouri Republican Presidential Primary's results were nonbinding on the state's national convention delegates. Voters in Callaway County supported former U.S. Senator Rick Santorum (R-Pennsylvania), who finished first in the state at large, but eventually lost the nomination to former Governor Mitt Romney (R-Massachusetts). Delegates to the congressional district and state conventions were chosen at a county caucus, which selected a delegation favoring Romney. Incumbent President Barack Obama easily won the Missouri Democratic Primary and renomination. He defeated Romney in the general election.

2008
In 2008, the Missouri Republican Presidential Primary was closely contested, with Senator John McCain (R-Arizona) prevailing and eventually winning the nomination. However, former Governor Mike Huckabee (R-Arkansas) won a plurality in Callaway County.

Then-Senator Hillary Clinton (D-New York) received more votes than any candidate from either party in Callaway County during the 2008 presidential primary. Despite initial reports that Clinton had won Missouri, Barack Obama (D-Illinois), also a Senator at the time, narrowly defeated her statewide and later became that year's Democratic nominee, going on to win the presidency.

Communities

Cities

 Auxvasse
 Fulton (county seat)
 Holts Summit
 Jefferson City (mostly in Cole County)
 Mokane
 New Bloomfield

Villages
 Kingdom City
 Lake Mykee Town

Unincorporated communities

 Bachelor
 Boydsville
 Callaway
 Calwood
 Carrington
 Cedar City
 Concord
 Dixie
 Earl
 Guthrie
 Hams Prairie
 Hatton
 Hereford
 Millersburg
 Portland
 Readsville
 Reform
 Shamrock
 Steedman
 Stephens
 Tebbetts
 Toledo
 Wainwright
 Williamsburg
 Youngers
 Yucatan

Townships over time
Administrative Townships in Callaway County were created February 12, 1821, when there only two. Cote Sans Dessein Township generally included areas west of a line along the Auxvasse River (now called Auxvasse Creek) until it met about 91W45 longitude, where the boundary then continued straight north. Auxvasse Township (which never included the city of Auxvasse) included all areas east of that line, but that changed within about 3 months. On May 14, 1821, a new larger-than-today Round Prairie Township originally covered NW Callaway County, and the next day an Elizabeth (later renamed Fulton) Township was created in the center of the county, along with a later-subdivided Nine Mile Prairie Township that included NE Callaway County. More changes took place only a few years afterward with the creation of a larger-than-today Cedar Township November 13, 1824, that initially covered the SW corner of the county; then a new Bourbon Township (from northern Round Prairie) was created February 21, 1825; a later-subdivided Liberty Township February 24, 1838 and Jackson Township December 25, 1875, in north county; Calwood Township February 23, 1876; Caldwell Township June 5, 1883. These were followed between 1883 and 1897 by the creation of St. Aubert, Summit, and Guthrie townships in SW Callaway; and McCredie and Shamrock townships in northern Callaway.  In the 2000s, West Fulton split from Fulton Township (later renamed East Fulton).  More details on the boundaries, included cities and towns, and impact on previous boundaries are included in the articles below:

 Auxvasse
 Bourbon
 Caldwell
 Calwood
 Cedar
 Cleveland
 Cote Sans Dessein
 East Fulton
 Guthrie
 Jackson
 Liberty
 McCredie
 Nine Mile Prairie
 Round Prairie
 St. Aubert
 Shamrock
 Summit
 West Fulton

Notable people
 William F. Baker, structural engineer for the Burj Khalifa
 Morris Frederick Bell, architect
 Nick Cave, fabric sculptor, dancer, and performance artist 
 Henry Bellamann, poet and author of Kings Row
 John Ferrugia, journalist
 Tony Galbreath,  running back in the NFL for the New Orleans Saints (1976–1980), the Minnesota Vikings (1981–1983), and the New York Giants (1984–1987)
 William Lincoln Garver, architect, author, and socialist politician
 Charlie James,  Major League Baseball outfielder for the St. Louis Cardinals (1960–1965)
 John Jameson, U.S. Representative from Missouri (1839-1841, 1843-1845, 1847-1849) 
 Michael Kim, ESPN anchor and personality
 Bake McBride, Major League Baseball outfielder and 1974 National League Rookie of the Year
 Ron McBride, running back in the National Football League for the Green Bay Packers 1973
 Laura Redden Searing, also known as Howard Glyndon, deaf poet and writer
 Justin Smith, former NFL player
 Helen Stephens, 1936 Olympic Champion (The Fulton Flash)
Ike Clanton old west outlaw who fought the Earp Family in Tombstone, AZ

See also
National Register of Historic Places listings in Callaway County, Missouri

References

Further reading
 Bell, Ovid.  "A Short History of Callaway County" (Fulton, MO: Ovid Bell Press, 1875).
 Bryan, William Smith.  "A History of Pioneer Families in Missouri" (St Louis, MO: Bryan, Brand & Co, 1876).
 Kingdom of Callaway Historical Society. A History of Callaway County Missouri (Fulton, MO: Kingdom of Callaway Historical Society, 1983).
 Kingdom of Callaway Historical Society. Combined Atlases of Callaway County Missouri 1876-1897-1919, Indexed. (Mount Vernon, IN: Windmill Publications, Inc, 1994).
 Mather, Otis.  "Six Generations of LaRues and Allied Families". (Hodgenville & Louisville, KY: C T Dearing Printing Co, 1921).
 Missouri State Library. "History of Callaway County." (St Louis, MO: National Historical Company, 1884).
 Saeger, Andrew M.  "The Kingdom Of Callaway: Callaway County, Missouri during the Civil War." (MA thesis, Northwest Missouri State University, 2013). bibliography pp 75–81 online
 Smith, Harriet E.  "Autobiography of Mark Twain"  (Berkeley, CA: University of California Press, 2010).
 Williams, Walter, ed.  "A History of Northeast Missouri" (Chicago, IL: Lewis Publishing Company, 1913).

External links
Callaway County official website
Callaway County Clerk website
Kingdom of Callaway Historical Society
Callaway Chamber of Commerce 
 Digitized 1930 Plat Book of Callaway County  from University of Missouri Division of Special Collections, Archives, and Rare Books
Callaway County in 1930 (w townships boundaries) A 1930 map of Callaway County, including township boundaries.
Callaway County in 1919 (w township boundaries) A 1919 map of Callaway County, including township boundaries.
Callaway County in 1897 (w township boundaries) (page 7)
Callaway County in 1876 (w township boundaries)  (page2) (Note that in 1850, the US Census referred to numbered districts in the county rather than the townships which were created around the time of Missouri statehood and described, in text, in the Missouri State Library's "History of Callaway County", listed above in the bibliography section.)
Map of Slave-holder percentages in US southeastern states, per 1860 census, published by a University of Central Florida scholar, showing Callaway County not among the more slave-populated counties among the southeastern US states in general, or even of Missouri. Note that other maps on the same topic show substantially different indicators. All data should be checked for sources, and compared to census records, with attention to the difference between the number of slaves in a county and the percentage of slave population in a county.
Map Showing Distribution of Slave Population, per 1860 census. A second similar map published in 1861 shows substantially different indicators, especially in Missouri.  Census data for 1860 may need to be reviewed to see which of the two maps is more accurate. Note that percentage of slave population is not the same as percentage of slave-owning population.

 
1820 establishments in Missouri Territory
Populated places established in 1820
Jefferson City metropolitan area
Missouri Rhineland
Little Dixie (Missouri)
Separatism in the United States
Missouri counties on the Missouri River